Les Norton is an Australian television drama series screened on ABC on 4 August 2019. It is adapted from a series of fiction books written by Australian author Robert G. Barrett and stars Alexander Bertrand as the protagonist, Les Norton.

Synopsis
Les Norton is set in 1985 and follows the exploits of Les Norton, a country bloke from outback Queensland, on the run from a troubled past. He arrives in Sydney, where he lands a job as a bouncer at an illegal casino. While he is desperate to return home, he finds himself seduced by the city's illicit charms and is dragged into the web of underground crime.

Cast
 Alexander Bertrand as Les Norton a new bouncer at an underground Sydney casino
 David Wenham as Price Galese, kingpin of the casino
 Rebel Wilson as Doreen, a brothel owner in the Western suburbs, and her identical twin sister Dolores Bognor
 Rhys Muldoon as The Minister, a politician who puts the "C" in corruption
 Hunter Page-Lochard as Billy Dunne, a former pro boxer turned casino doorman
 Steve Le Marquand as Ray "Thumper" Burell, a crooked cop
 Syd Zygier as Constable Emily Gold
 Pallavi Sharda as Georgie, the casino manager
 Justin Rosniak as Eddie Salita, Price's gun-for-hire
 Kate Box as Lauren "Lozza" Johnson, a party girl advertising executive

Production
Les Norton is produced by Daniel Edwards and John Edwards from Roadshow Rough Diamond. It has been created for television by Morgan O'Neill with writers Christopher Lee, Samantha Winston, Shanti Gudgeon, Malcolm Knox and Jessica Tuckwell. It is directed by Jocelyn Moorhouse, Fadia Abboud, David Caesar and Morgan O'Neill.

Episodes

References

External links

2019 Australian television series debuts
Television shows set in Sydney
Australian Broadcasting Corporation original programming
English-language television shows
Television shows based on Australian novels